A külliye is a complex of buildings associated with Turkish architecture centered on a mosque and managed within a single institution, often based on a waqf (charitable foundation) and composed of a madrasa, a Dar al-Shifa ("clinic"), kitchens, bakery, Turkish bath, other buildings for various charitable services for the community and further annexes. The term is derived from the Arabic word kull "all".

The tradition of külliye is particularly marked in Turkish architecture, starting in Seljuq, then especially in Ottoman, and also in Timurid architectural legacies.

History
The külliyye concept is based on the earliest form of the mosque. The mosque was not only used as a house of praying but also as a place for eating, teaching and as a hostel for the poor. The structure of the külliyye derived from such concept. Instead of using one mosque for various services, other buildings were built to center on the mosque that provided the specific services. The services expanded and "were incorporated under one foundation document, and each housed its own building within an enclosure" (Goodwin, 2008). This included the foundation of hospitals, law schools, preparatory college and a medical school among other services.

The majority of külliyye were constructed and designed by architect Sinan. He was the master architect of the Ottoman Empire for fifty years in the sixteenth century. As master architect, he was responsible for all planning and constructional works in the empire. Sinan built most of the külliyye in Istanbul. The külliyye built by Sinan set the pattern for other külliyye architects. Most külliyye followed these patterns: they were "located at the important points of the city" and the structure emphasize the religious center of the mosque. In addition, they were either "built on hills and sloped lands, coasts or peripheries of the city". The reason for this is that külliyye helped create the silhouette and landscape of the city. The külliyye were easily recognizable in that form and one is able to marvel at them from afar.

According to Ottoman Empire law, the lands and the state belonged to the Sultans. As a result of this, külliyye are usually built for either the Sultan, one of the family members of the Ottoman Sultans or for the high state administrative officials such as the vizier or grand vizier. These aristocrats became the employers of architect Sinan and many others architects. As employers, they had a choice in choosing the location of the külliyye and had an input in its design; thus, they had an influence on the construction of the külliyye.

Significance in Ottoman history
Külliyyes had an important impact on Ottoman society. Külliyye located in residential areas united the vicinity and residents and it served them with its various functional buildings. There were so many külliyye in the Ottoman capital (Istanbul) that they serve as the centers that introduce the actual identity of the city. The külliyye came to be the cores of many cities in the Ottoman Empire (especially Istanbul) and acted as important centers of cultural, religious, commercial and educational activities. They serve as one of the symbol of power and achievement of the Ottoman Empire.

Administration
The administration of the külliyye rested upon the administrative officers also under the chief eunuch in the department of harem at Topkapi Palace (Ottoman Sultans primary and official palace of residence). Among the administrative officers, the külliyye also had "religious officers and teachers, porters, chanters, grave diggers, servants responsible for maintenance, including the polishing of courtyards and window grilles, cooks, scullions, plumbers, lamp-lighters, a guard against the theft of oil lamps, carpenters, masons and tillers responsible for the lead sheets covering over 500 domes". The staff magnitude illustrate the sophistication of the külliyye; though it began with a simple concept, it had developed and become complex that a magnitude of staffs and officers were needed to manage it. The kitchen was responsible for feeding the staff and officers, as well as the students, travelers and the poor. This required an enormous supply of water, which serve as another reason for why the külliyye were built near the coasts and peripheral parts of the city.

Külliyye rose funding for the cost of the building and for the maintenance of such a vast foundation. This funding or endowments were "raised by public subscription, including the gift of various properties, ranging from entire estates to a mill or cottage". The donors ranged from the ruler (the Sultan) to office holders of greater and lesser ranks and then to the common people. The ruler tended to be the most significant donor as he was capable of assigning the revenues of a part of the realm.

Examples of külliyye

The greatest of the külliyye ever built was Süleymanyie Külliyye in Istanbul. It was built by Mehmed II and Suleiman the Magnificent. The külliyye had "seven madrasas (schools), four of each of the Sunni law schools, a preparatory college and one for studying the Hadith and a medical school". These madrasas incorporated their own courts, latrines and two houses for the teachers. In addition, "there was a school for boys, a chantry, a hostel with stables, a bath, hospitals, public kitchen, shops, and fountains". Süleymanyie Külliyye stood out with its educational services along with its religious services. The külliyye environment resembled a university campus and it was the cultural and scientific center for Istanbul.

There were many other külliyye, but none of them came to the magnitude of Süleymanyie Külliyye. Examples of other külliyye are: Sokullu Mehmet Pasha
Külliyye, Zal Mahmut Pasha Külliyye and Mihrimah Sultan Külliyye etc. The Sokullu Mehmet Pasha Külliyye consists of a mosque, madrasa and a dervish lodge. The Zal Mahmut Pasha Külliyye consists of a mosque, madrasa, mausoleum and fountain. Finally, the Mihrimah Sultan Külliyye consists of a mosque, madrasa, mausoleum and Koran school for children (khan, public kitchen, and hostel).

Notable külliye
 The Yeni Valide Mosque complex was among the largest built külliyye constructed in Istanbul. It was built by two powerful dynastic women, Safiye Sultan and Turhan Sultan, mothers of Mehmed III and Mehmed IV respectively. It follows in the pattern of the above külliyye, whereby it was built on a slope and located at the important points of Eminönü, Istanbul.
 Battal Gazi Külliye, dedicated to a saint, in Seyitgazi, Eskişehir, commissioned in 1208 by Ümmühan Hatun, wife of Kaykhusraw I, the sultan of the Sultanate of Rum, and extended in 1511 by the Ottoman sultan Bayezid II
 Orhan Gazi Külliye in Bursa, commissioned in 1339 by the Ottoman sultan Orhan Gazi
 Hudavendigar Külliye in Bursa, commissioned between 1365 and 1385 by the Ottoman sultan Murad I
 Bayezid I Mosque and Külliye in Bursa, commissioned between 1390 and 1395 by the Ottoman sultan Bayezid I
 Emir Sultan Mosque and Külliye in Bursa, dedicated to the dervish and scholar Emir Sultan, built for the first time in the 14th century, and re-built in 1804 following the destruction caused by 1766 Bursa earthquake, rebuilt again in 1868 following the destruction caused by 1855 Bursa earthquake
 Timurtaş Pasha Mosque and Külliye in Bursa, commissioned between 1404 and 1420 by the Ottoman commander Kara Timurtaş Pasha
 Mehmed I Mosque in Bursa, commissioned between 1419 and 1421 by the Ottoman sultan Mehmed I
 Muradiye Külliye in Bursa, commissioned in 1426-1428 by the Ottoman sultan Murad II
 Fatih Mosque and Külliye in Istanbul, commissioned between 1463 and 1470 by the Ottoman sultan Mehmed the Conqueror
 Bayezid II Mosque and Külliye in Amasya, commissioned by the Ottoman sultan Bayezid II in 1485-1486
 Complex of Sultan Bayezid II in Edirne, commissioned in 1488 by the Ottoman sultan Bayezid II
 Selimiye Mosque and Külliye in Edirne, commissioned by Ottoman sultan Selim I in 1522
 Abdul-Qadir Gilani Külliye in Baghdad, commissioned by Ottoman sultan Suleiman the Magnificent in 1534
 Great Mosque Külliye, in Adana, completed by Ramazanoğlu Piri Mehmet Paşa in 1540
 Şehzade Mosque and Külliye in Istanbul, commissioned by Suleiman the Magnificent in 1548
 Süleymaniye Mosque and Külliye in Istanbul, commissioned by Suleiman the Magnificent in the 1550s
 Muradiye Mosque and Külliye in Manisa, commissioned by Ottoman sultan Murad III between 1583 and 1592

See also
Istanbul
Madrasa
Hammam
Hadith
Yeni Valide Mosque
Mosque
Mehmed II Fatih
Sulayman I
Topkapi Sarayi
Presidential Complex
Islamic architecture

Bibliography
Goodwin, Godfrey. 2008. "Külliyye." Encyclopaedia of Islam, vol. 5. Eds. P. Bearman and others. Amsterdam: Brill, p. 366, Column 2.
Thys-Şenocak, Lucienne. 1998. The Yeni Valide Mosque Complex at Eminönü. Muqarnas 15: 58–70.
H. G. Agkun, A. Turk. (2008, March 25). Determination and analysis of site selection factors for kulliyes of architect Sinan with respect to the locations in the Ottoman city of Istanbul. Building and Environment (Vol: 43, Issue: 5), pp. 720–735
G. Goodwin, A history of Ottoman architecture, London 1971

References

External links
http://www.planetware.com/map/kulliye-mosque-of-suleyman-the-magnificent-map-tr-sulsk.htm
http://bidbpersonel.trakya.edu.tr/KULLIYE/kulliye_ing/
http://www.thais.it/architettura/islamica/schede/sc_00222_uk.htm
https://www.flickr.com/photos/traces/2093070074/
http://www.trekearth.com/gallery/Middle_East/Turkey/photo607167.htm
http://www.turkeyodyssey.com/articles/suleymaniye-mosque-and-kulliye.html
http://www.golmarmara.gov.tr/halime%20hatun/photos/view_3.html

Society of the Ottoman Empire
Islamic architectural elements
Islamic architecture
Ottoman architecture